Paul Horn may refer to:
Paul Horn (musician) (1930–2014), American jazz flutist
Paul Horn (computer scientist) (born 1946), American computer scientist